The Siptan (Korean: 십단전, Hanja: 十段戰) was a South Korean Go competition. Begun in 2005, it was held eight times and was discontinued after 2013.

Outline
The Siptan was sponsored by Wonik Corporation and the Hanguk Kiwon. The format was hayago (blitz) with 10 minutes total and 40 seconds for byo-yomi. The final is decided in a best-of-3 match. The winner's purse was 25,000,000 Won (~US$26,000). It was the Korean equivalent of the Japanese Judan title.

Past winners and runners-up

See also
Judan

References

External links
 Sensei's Library
 gotoeveryone.k2ss.info
 Korea Baduk Association (in Korean)

Go competitions in South Korea